Nahlin Mountain is a mountain on the north side of the Nahlin River in far northwestern British Columbia, Canada.

See also
Nahlin Plateau

References

One-thousanders of British Columbia
Cassiar Country
Taku Plateau
Interior Mountains